Maxi taxis are private, owner-operated minibuses in Romania and Trinidad and Tobago that are used in public transport. They operate along fixed routes, having fixed fares and meeting points, but do not operate under a timetable.

Australia
Similar maxi taxis are found in Australia.

Barbados
ZR buses in Barbados supplement the government-run buses.

Philippines
In the Philippines, maxi-taxis are referred to in English as shuttles (Tagalog: siyatel; Cebuano: syatol).

Trinidad and Tobago
The colours of each route as follows:
 Port of Spain–Arima (and onward to Sangre Grande): Red Band (G11)
 Port of Spain–Diego Martin (or Chaguaramas): Yellow Band (W11)
 Port of Spain–San Fernando (including Curepe–Chaguanas–Couva): Green Band (W18)
 San Fernando–Princes Town (and onward to Mayaro): Black Band (W21)
 South of San Fernando (Point Fortin, Cedros)–Siparia: Brown Band (W22)
 Tobago: Blue Band (G17)

The fares are paid on board and are based on distance. They come in 12 and 25 seater versions. The maxi taxi was introduced in 1978.

See also 
 Dolmuş, their Turkish counterpart
 Marshrutka, their Russian counterpart

External links 

 Trinidad & Tobago Route Taxis at TnTIsland.com

References 

1978 introductions
Transport in Romania
Transport in Trinidad and Tobago